Aïssatou Kouyaté (born 19 April 1995) is a French female handball player who plays for Brest Bretagne Handball and the French national team as a right back.

She represented France at the 2020 European Women's Handball Championship.

On April 2021, she suffered from an anterior cruciate ligament (ACL) injury on her left knee which made her forfeit the 2020 Summer Olympics.

About a year later on February 2022, she suffered an injury on the same knee during a Champions league match. She had recently come back on the pitch after physical therapy.

Achievements

Club

Domestic 

 French league (Division 1 Féminine):
 Runner up: 2022 (with Brest Bretagne Handball)
 3rd: 2021 (with ES Besançon) 

 French Women's League Cup Championship (Coupe de la Ligue):
 Finalist: 2016 (with OGC Nice HB)

National team 

 European Championship
 2020: 
 Junior World Championship
 2014: 5th

References

External links

1995 births
Living people
Sportspeople from Clichy, Hauts-de-Seine
French female handball players